Hacienda Kankabchén is located in the Tixkokob Municipality in the state of Yucatán in southeastern Mexico. It is one of the properties that arose during the nineteenth century henequen boom. There are numerous other properties of this name in the Yucatán including Hacienda Kancabchén in Baca, Hacienda Kancabchén (Halachó), Hacienda Kancabchén (Homún), Hacienda Kancabchén (Motul), Hacienda Kankabchén (Seyé), Hacienda Kancabchén (Tunkás), Hacienda Kancabchén Ucí and Hacienda Kancabchén de Valencia.

Toponymy
The name (Kancabchén) is a word from the Mayan language meaning the well of the red ground.

How to get there
At the east side of Mérida, from the Periférico, take Calle 65 approximately 19 km to Tixkokob. Then go 5 km north on Calle 18 to Hacienda Kankabchén.

History

Architecture
As is evident from photographs, the architectural structures have decayed and no habitable buildings remain.

Demographics
All of the henequen plantations ceased to exist as autonomous communities with the agrarian land reform implemented by President Lazaro Cardenas in 1937. His decree turned the haciendas into collective ejidos, leaving only 150 hectares to the former landowners for use as private property. Figures before 1937 indicate populations living on the farm. After 1937, figures indicate those living in the community, as the remaining Hacienda Kankabchén houses only the owner's immediate family.

According to the 2005 census conducted by the INEGI, there is no permanent population residing in the area.

References

Bibliography
 Bracamonte, P and Solís, R., Los espacios de autonomía maya, Ed. UADY, Mérida, 1997.
 Gobierno del Estado de Yucatán, "Los municipios de Yucatán", 1988.
 Kurjack, Edward y Silvia Garza, Atlas arqueológico del Estado de Yucatán, Ed. INAH, 1980.
 Patch, Robert, La formación de las estancias y haciendas en Yucatán durante la colonia, Ed. UADY, 1976.
 Peón Ancona, J. F., "Las antiguas haciendas de Yucatán", en Diario de Yucatán, Mérida, 1971.

Photo gallery

Populated places in Yucatán
Haciendas of Yucatán